Aguada de Pasajeros is a municipality and town in the Cienfuegos Province of Cuba.

Geography
The municipality is divided into the town of Aguada and the villages of Carreño, Real Campiña, Covadonga and Perseverancia. Yaguaramas, now  part of Abreus municipality, was part of it until the 1977 administrative reform.

Demographics
In 2004, the municipality of Aguada de Pasajeros had a population of 31,687.

Transport
The town is served by the A1 motorway and counts a train station on a line linking Havana to Cienfuegos.

See also
Municipalities of Cuba
List of cities in Cuba

References

External links

Populated places in Cienfuegos Province